Asaeli Tikoirotuma (born 24 June 1986) is a Fijian rugby union player. His regular playing position is wing.
Until 2018 he played for the London Irish in the Green King IPA Championship
In his inaugural Super Rugby season in 2012, he won the Super Rugby title with the Chiefs on 4 August at the 2012 Super Rugby Final at home at Waikato Stadium, Hamilton. At the end of the 2012 season, he scored 7 tries, which meant he was joint 10th with 4 other players on the leading try scorers table.

In October 2013, he was named in the Fiji team to their 2013 end-of-year tour.

On 5 June 2014, Tikoirotuma officially joined Harlequins in England on a two-year contract. However, he was granted early release to join Premiership rivals London Irish for the forthcoming 2015–16 season.

References

External links
 

Living people
1986 births
Fijian rugby union players
Chiefs (rugby union) players
Rugby union wings
Manawatu rugby union players
Fijian expatriate rugby union players
Expatriate rugby union players in New Zealand
Expatriate rugby union players in England
Fijian expatriate sportspeople in New Zealand
Fiji international rugby union players
Sportspeople from Suva
Harlequin F.C. players
Fijian expatriate sportspeople in England
London Irish players
Moana Pasifika players
Rugby union centres
North Harbour rugby union players
Counties Manukau rugby union players